The 2020–21 Alabama A&M Bulldogs basketball team represented Alabama A&M University in the 2020–21 NCAA Division I men's basketball season. The Bulldogs, led by third-year head coach Dylan Howard, played their home games at the Elmore Gymnasium in Normal, Alabama as members of the Southwestern Athletic Conference.

Previous season
The Bulldogs finished the 2019–20 season 8–22, 5–13 in SWAC play to finish in eighth place. They lost in the quarterfinals of the SWAC tournament to Prairie View A&M.

Roster

Schedule and results 

|-
!colspan=12 style=| Non-conference regular season

|-
!colspan=9 style=| SWAC regular season

|-

Source

References

Alabama A&M Bulldogs basketball seasons
Alabama AandM Bulldogs
Alabama AandM Bulldogs basketball
Alabama AandM Bulldogs basketball